Jack's Restaurant was a restaurant in San Francisco, California. Opened in 1863, Jack’s was the second oldest restaurant in the city, following Tadich Grill.

It was made a San Francisco Designated Landmark in 1981.

In 2002, French-born chef Philippe Jeanty purchased Jack's, later renaming it Jeanty at Jack's, and operated it as a brasserie, until it abruptly closed in May 2009.

In June 2016, Bar Works purchased the building for a reported $3.55 million, announcing plans to convert the location into co-working space, with food and a bar. As of 2022 that had not materialized.

References

Restaurants in San Francisco
San Francisco Designated Landmarks
1863 establishments in California
2009 disestablishments in California
Defunct restaurants in the San Francisco Bay Area

N